Ivan Firer (born 19 November 1984) is a Slovenian footballer who plays for Straža Hum na Sutli as a forward.

References

External links
 NZS profile 
 

1984 births
Living people
Sportspeople from Celje
Slovenian footballers
Slovenia international footballers
Association football forwards
Slovenian expatriate footballers
Expatriate footballers in Iceland
Expatriate footballers in Vietnam
Expatriate footballers in France
Expatriate footballers in Croatia
Slovenian expatriate sportspeople in Iceland
Slovenian expatriate sportspeople in France
Slovenian expatriate sportspeople in Croatia
NK Aluminij players
NK Drava Ptuj players
NK Celje players
NK Rudar Velenje players
Thanh Hóa FC players
Becamex Binh Duong FC players
NK Domžale players
AJ Auxerre players
NK Rogaška players
Slovenian Second League players
Slovenian PrvaLiga players
V.League 1 players
Ligue 2 players
Championnat National 3 players
Second Football League (Croatia) players